Pastor Esther Bharathi is India's first transgender pastor from the Evangelical Church of India (ECI) branch in Chengalpattu, India. She goes by Pastor Bharathi.

Early life 
Pastor Esther Bharathi was born in Tuticorn as the third child and first son to a Hindu family.  Her parents named her "Bharath Raja." She was constantly taunted by classmates and neighbors for being feminine. "I became a loner and could not even complete Class 12," she told Times of India. Tired of family ridicule, she ran away to Chennai where she joined a group of transgender people.

A sister from a local church took pity on her and took her in. She converted to Christianity at the age of 12 and was baptised in the year 2000. Pastor Bharathi began her transition in 2007.

Personal 
As an independent pastor, she lives in a one room home in the Tsunami settlement in Chennai, Tamil Nadu. While travelling in India & abroad, she not only preaches but also raises awareness on trans issues. 

In an interview, she mentioned that her proudest moment was when her niece called her "Aunty", despite admonishments from the other elders in the family to call her "Uncle".

Education 
She struggled her way through education before finding her path as a pastor. One of her sisters enrolled her in a lab technician training course in Chennai. But she had to quit because her classmates ridiculed her threading of eyebrows and use of make-up. She then moved to Coimbatore where she worked as an accountant at a weighbridge for a couple of months, but had to quit after facing harassment from truck drivers.

Bharathi finally graduated with a Bachelor of Divinity from Madras Theological Seminary and College in Chennai. She graduated in 2011, in front of a crowd of 7,000 people.

Career 
Two months after her graduation, in 2011, she was sent to lead a congregation of about 40 parishioners in Natarajapuram, a village approximately 60 km away from Chennai. Bharathi conducts service in Tamil and English every Sunday and also conducts baby showers and christenings. Her estranged family have finally embraced her transgender status and are proud of her work towards society.

References

Year of birth missing (living people)
Living people
Dalit women
Transgender women
Indian transgender people
LGBT Protestant clergy